Hridayer Shabdo is a 2014 Bengali romance film directed by Sushanta Pal Choudhury and produced by Hasibur Rehman Akhan. The film features actors Aviraj and Pamela Mondal in the lead roles. Music of the film was composed by D. Arun. It was well received by the critics.

Plot 
The story of the film revolves around a man, his children and their respective love lives.

Cast 
 Aviraj
 Pamela Mondal
 Biswajit Chakraborty
 Samrat Mukherjee
 Sukanta Mondol
 Anuradha Roy
 Debapriya
 Runa Choudhury

Soundtrack 
Film score of Hridayer Shabdo has been composed by D. Arun. Playback singers include Saikat Mitra, Sumita Palchoudhury and Mahua Sen.

References 

Bengali-language Indian films
2010s Bengali-language films